Eristalis pertinax is a European hoverfly. Like Eristalis tenax, the larva of E. pertinax is a rat-tailed maggot and lives in drainage ditches, pools around manure piles, sewage, and similar places containing water with high organic load and low oxygen concentration.

Description
External images
For terms see Morphology of Diptera
Wing length 8.25–12.75 mm. Antennomere 3 brown-black. Arista plumose to tip. Tarsi 1 and 2 entirely yellow. Wing with diffusely bordered darkened median band and pterostigma 4 times as
long as wide. Dimorphic (males with triangular abdomen, females with squarish abdomen).
The male genitalia are figured by Hippa et al. (2001). The larva is figured by Hartley (1961).

Distribution
Palaearctic Fennoscandia South to Iberia and the Mediterranean basin. Ireland East through Europe into Turkey and European Russia East to the Urals.

Biology
The habitat is wetland, forest, alluvial forest, fen, farmland, suburban gardens and parks. The flight period is February to November.

Gallery

References

Eristalinae
Diptera of Europe
Insects described in 1763
Articles containing video clips
Taxa named by Giovanni Antonio Scopoli